Wilmot is a city in Ashley County, Arkansas, United States. The population was 550 at the 2010 census.

History
In 1927, a young Black man named Winston Pounds was tortured and hanged by a mob of some fifty armed white men, for allegedly having attempted to assault a white woman.

Geography
The town borders Lake Enterprise, a popular location for local fishing and watersports.

Demographics

2020 census

As of the 2020 United States census, there were 416 people, 135 households, and 96 families residing in the city.

2000 census
As of the census of 2000, there were 786 people, 290 households, and 187 families residing in the city. The racial makeup of the city was 24.17% White, 75.19% Black or African American, and 0.64% from two or more races.  0.64% of the population were Hispanic or Latino of any race.

There were 290 households, out of which 27.2% had children under the age of 18 living with them, 35.5% were married couples living together, 24.1% had a female householder with no husband present, and 35.2% were non-families. 33.1% of all households were made up of individuals, and 16.9% had someone living alone who was 65 years of age or older.  The average household size was 2.54 and the average family size was 3.27.

In the city, the population was spread out, with 26.8% under the age of 18, 9.0% from 18 to 24, 21.0% from 25 to 44, 22.8% from 45 to 64, and 20.4% who were 65 years of age or older.  The median age was 39 years. For every 100 females, there were 77.0 males.  For every 100 females age 18 and over, there were 80.8 males.

The median income for a household in the city was $14,167, and the median income for a family was $20,917. Males had a median income of $22,188 versus $17,250 for females. The per capita income for the city was $9,528.  About 38.1% of families and 40.4% of the population were below the poverty line, including 53.6% of those under age 18 and 49.2% of those age 65 or over.

Education 
Public education is provided to elementary and secondary school students from the Hamburg School District. Students complete their secondary education and graduate from Hamburg High School.

It was served by the Wilmot School District until July 1, 1986, when it consolidated into Hamburg SD. The Hamburg district continued to operate Wilmot Elementary School. Circa 1996 the school had 100 students; circa 2016 this was down to 42. Around that time the Hamburg district board decided to close the school citing the lower enrollment and financial concerns. A party filed a lawsuit against the district in response to the closure.

References

Cities in Ashley County, Arkansas
Cities in Arkansas